Daniel Caplen (born 27 March 1992), also known as his stage name D/C, is a British R&B singer, songwriter and musician based in Brixton in London. He was educated at St Edmund's School Canterbury. He is signed to Atlantic Records UK and released his first track "Longing for You" on the label on 19 February 2016.

In 2019 Caplen won an Ivor Novello Award for PRS for Music Most Performed Work for "These Days", performed by Rudimental, Jess Glynne, Macklemore and Dan Caplen.

Early life
Caplen was born in London to a mother from Saint Vincent and the Grenadines and an English father, and was educated at St Edmund's School Canterbury.
He started playing the piano and the cello in his early teens, before getting interested in production and remixing. Caplen briefly left Britain to study in Portland,  Oregon, a move which helped to inspire his approach as an artist.

Music career
In 2014, D/C self-released his debut EP, Epiphany, gaining the attention of Atlantic Records, who signed him to the label in the following year. He then released his first single “Longing for You” on the label in February 2016. The track is taken from his first Atlantic Records EP Bad Man released in 2016.

D/C supported UK electronic duo Honne on their UK tour in October 2015 as well as Anne-Marie on her UK tour in January/February 2016.

D/C also performed at The Great Escape 2016 festival in Brighton, United Kingdom.

In 2018, Caplen achieved his first UK number-one single, "These Days", alongside Rudimental, Jess Glynne and Macklemore.

Discography

Extended plays

Singles

As lead artist

As featured artist

References

External links

British contemporary R&B singers
21st-century Black British male singers
People from Brixton
Singers from London
Living people
Atlantic Records artists
1992 births